Tyun, Tyown, or Tiwn (majuscule: Տ; minuscule: տ; Armenian: տյուն; Classical Armenian: տիւմ) is the thirty-first letter of the Armenian alphabet. It has a numerical value of 4000.

See also
 Armenian alphabet
 Mesrop Mashtots

References

External links
 Տ on Wiktionary
 տ on Wiktionary

Armenian letters